Mohd Firdaus bin Ahmad is a Malaysian politician and currently serves as Kedah State Executive Councillor.

Election Results

References 

Living people
People from Kedah
Malaysian people of Malay descent
Malaysian Muslims
Malaysian United Indigenous Party politicians
21st-century Malaysian politicians
Year of birth missing (living people)
Members of the Kedah State Legislative Assembly
 Kedah state executive councillors